Woodman Peak may refer to:

 Woodman Peak (Utah), a summit in Tooele County, Utah
 Woodman Peak (California), a summit in Mendocino  County, California